Westfield Township is one of fifteen townships in Surry County, North Carolina, United States. The township had a population of 2,464 according to the 2000 census.

Geographically, Westfield Township occupies  in northeastern Surry County.  There are no incorporated municipalities within Westfield Township; however, there are several smaller, unincorporated communities located here, including Albion, Mount Herman, Westfield and Woodville.

Townships in Surry County, North Carolina
Townships in North Carolina